This is a list of electricity-generating power stations in the U.S. state of Oklahoma, sorted by type and name. In 2021, Oklahoma had a total summer capacity of 29,824 MW through all of its power plants, and a net generation of 80,755 GWh. The corresponding electrical energy generation mix was 14% coal, 40.8% natural gas, 41.4% wind, 3.4% hydroelectric, 0.1% solar, and 0.4% biomass.

Fossil-fuel power stations

Coal-fired

Natural gas-fired

Petroleum-fired

Renewable power stations
Data from the U.S. Energy Information Administration serves as a general reference.

Biomass

Hydroelectric

Wind farms

Solar farms

References

 
Oklahoma
Lists of buildings and structures in Oklahoma
Energy in Oklahoma